The American Guardian was a newspaper published in Oklahoma City, Oklahoma,  between 1931 and 1942. It succeeded The Oklahoma Weekly Leader.  The American Guardian came out weekly from its start on April 23, 1931 to October 10, 1941. Then it was published on a bimonthly basis until its closure on January 1, 1942. The editor of The American Guardian was Oscar Ameringer. The paper had a socialist political stance.

References

1931 establishments in Oklahoma
1942 disestablishments in Oklahoma
Defunct newspapers published in Oklahoma
Publications established in 1931
Publications disestablished in 1942
Newspapers published in Oklahoma City
Socialist newspapers published in the United States
Weekly newspapers published in the United States
Bimonthly newspapers